Myślęcin may refer to the following places:
Myślęcin, Greater Poland Voivodeship (west-central Poland)
Myślęcin, Warmian-Masurian Voivodeship (north Poland)
Myślęcin, West Pomeranian Voivodeship (north-west Poland)